Ghazi Saleh Marzouk (born 5 March 1951) is a Saudi Arabian athlete. He competed in the men's triple jump at the 1972 Summer Olympics and the men's high jump at the 1976 Summer Olympics.

References

1951 births
Living people
Athletes (track and field) at the 1972 Summer Olympics
Athletes (track and field) at the 1976 Summer Olympics
Saudi Arabian male triple jumpers
Saudi Arabian male high jumpers
Olympic athletes of Saudi Arabia
Place of birth missing (living people)